New Life Radio is a satellite radio network, based in Odessa, Ukraine. Formerly based in Moscow, relocating in 2019 after numerous restrictive Russian federal laws on religion, the press, and Internet regulation forced a decision to change locations, The NLR network broadcasts Christian programming  throughout Russia, Ukraine,Eastern Europe, and the Middle East via Hot Bird; and by Internet radio at www.NLRadio.net (Russian language) and www.NoveZhitya.net (Ukrainian language).   New Life Radio was configured as Russia's first satellite radio station, designed to transmit in a direct to home satellite broadcast mode to individual homes equipped with free to air satellite receivers.

History
New Life Radio (NLR) began as Russia's first Christian FM radio station, transmitting on 102.5 MHz in the city of Magadan, Russia (1996). Sensing the need to make Christian programming available in every community throughout the former Soviet Union, the station's management entered into a partnership with the Evangelical Covenant Church denomination (based in Chicago, Illinois) and HCJB World Radio (noted for developing the world's first Christian shortwave radio station in the early 1930s from Quito, Ecuador).  The partnership goal was to develop a satellite broadcast operation in Moscow, as made possible by the launch of the LMI satellite, a cooperative satellite venture between Lockheed Martin (a US aerospace company) and Intersputnik, a Russian government controlled satellite organization that allowed for first time transmission of direct to home satellite broadcast signals throughout the territory of Russia, Ukraine, and Belarus. LMI was launched on September 27, 1999 from a Russian proton rocket from the Baikonour Space launch facility in Kazakhstan.

During 1999, Dr. Daniel Johnson was assigned to coordinate the initiation of the radio service, and in that year, set up radio studios inside a restricted access government communication facility (GTURS) located on 7 Nikolskaya Street, directly across from the Kremlin on Red Square in Moscow. As soon as LMI's testing period was completed, the satellite radio service, now known as the New Life Radio Satellite Network, commenced operations over LMI in January 2001.  LMI was renamed ABS, after its sale to a telecom company based in Hong Kong.

From 2012-2019, New Life Radio Moscow delivered Christian programming in a non-denominational, non-commercial format to a global Russian-speaking audience on a variety of broadcast media platforms, including the Hot Bird satellite at 13 degrees east, Yamal 901 satellite; the Tricolor TV Network, using the Eutelsat W4 satellite, and on multiple streaming formats at www.NLRadio.net. The radio network (2020) is registered as a non-commercial partnership organization in Odessa, Ukraine as "RADIO NOVIE ZHITTYA-New Life Radio." As of September 2022, a new Ukrainian language radio service was initiated (www.NoveZhitya.net) and operates 24/7 targeting a national audience throughout Ukraine. Its US-based radio partner is Christian Radio For Russia & Ukraine, a 501(c)3 non-profit organization registered in the State of Illinois, with offices in Jamestown, New York  (www.CRFR.org).  A comprehensive history can be found at https://crfr.org/?page_id=3  (titled: 'The Beginnings of Christian Radio in Russia')

References
 
For a quick list of references, google:
"NEW LIFE RADIO Satellite Network"
"Christian Radio for Russia"

Satellite radio stations
Christian radio stations in Europe
Radio stations in Russia
Mass media in Moscow